A Connecticut Yankee is a 1931 American Pre-Code film adaptation of Mark Twain's 1889 novel, A Connecticut Yankee in King Arthur's Court. It was directed by David Butler to a script by William M. Conselman, Owen Davis, and Jack Moffitt. It was produced by Fox Film Corporation (later 20th Century Fox), who had earlier produced the 1921 silent adaptation of the novel, A Connecticut Yankee in King Arthur's Court. A Connecticut Yankee is the first sound film adaptation of Twain's novel. It is unrelated to the 1927 musical also titled A Connecticut Yankee.

As in The Wizard of Oz, many of the actors in the film play more than one role, a character in the real world and one in the dream world. The film stars Will Rogers as Hank Martin, an American accidental time traveler who finds himself in Camelot back in the days of King Arthur (William Farnum, a Fox star for many years). Myrna Loy and Brandon Hurst play the evil Morgan le Fay and Merlin, who must be overcome by Hank's modern technical knowledge, while Maureen O'Sullivan plays Alisande.

The hero's name was changed from Hank Morgan to Hank Martin, possibly because the original name sounded too similar to that of actor Frank Morgan.

A trailer for the film exists at the Library of Congress.

Plot
Radio salesman Hank Martin (Will Rogers), after being knocked out by a toppled suit of armor, travels back in time to Camelot where he is welcomed by King Arthur (William Farnum) and must use his modern knowledge to stop Morgana Le Fay (Myrna Loy) and Merlin (Brandon Hurst) from taking over.

Cast
 Will Rogers as Hank Martin
 William Farnum as King Arthur/Inventor
 Frank Albertson as Emile le Poulet/Clarence 
 Maureen O'Sullivan as Alisande/Woman in Mansion 
 Brandon Hurst as Merlin/Doctor in Mansion
 Myrna Loy as Morgana Le Fay/Evil Sister in Mansion 
 Mitchell Harris as Sagramor/Butler in Mansion 
 Heinie Conklin as Sneezing Man (uncredited)

Production
Fox was likely inspired to produce A Connecticut Yankee based on the success of the 1921 silent film. The 1931 version was likewise successful, and was re-released in 1936. The film cost $750,000 to make; the production used 174 Austin automobiles, among other pieces of modern machinery, to make the final battle scene. It was a commercial success despite being released during the Depression.

Although the film was released in black and white, director David Butler used progressively darker shades of pink tint to emphasize a scene in which Morgana Le Fay flirts with Hank Martin.

Notes

References
Lacy, Norris J. (1991). The New Arthurian Encyclopedia. New York: Garland. .

See also 
 1931 in science fiction

External links

 
The AFI Catalog of Feature Films:..A Connecticut Yankee

1931 films
1930s fantasy comedy films
1930s fantasy adventure films
Arthurian films
American fantasy adventure films
American fantasy comedy films
Films based on A Connecticut Yankee in King Arthur's Court
Films based on fantasy novels
Films about time travel
Films set in England
Films based on American novels
Fox Film films
American black-and-white films
1931 comedy films
1930s English-language films
1930s American films